Seiminlen Doungel (born 3 January 1994), simply known as Len Doungel, is an Indian professional footballer who plays as a winger for Indian Super League club Jamshedpur.

Career

East Bengal
Born in Saikul, Manipur, Doungel started his career in the youth team of JCT before joining East Bengal of the I-League in 2011. During his first season with the club Doungel played only a few times before making his international cup debut for East Bengal in the AFC Cup on 9 May 2012 against Kazma. He started that match and played 72 minutes before being substituted off as East Bengal lost 2–1.

Pailan Arrows (loan)
On 11 January 2013, during the 2012–13 season, Doungel was loaned out to fellow I-League side Pailan Arrows for the rest of the season. He made his debut for the side the next day on 12 January against Air India. He played 88 minutes before being substituted off as Pailan Arrows drew the match 1–1. He then scored his first professional goal of his career for the club on 24 March 2013 against Mohun Bagan. He found the net in the 49th minute but could not help his side from losing 3–2 that match.

Doungel then scored his second and final goal for Pailan Arrows on 20 April 2013 against Salgaocar. His 36th-minute strike being the lone goal for Arrows as the fell on the day 2–1.

Return to East Bengal
For the 2013–14 season Doungel returned to East Bengal. He made his return debut for the club on 1 November 2013 against Salgaocar at the Kalyani Stadium. Doungel came on as a 71st-minute substitute for Chidi Edeh and then scored a 77th-minute goal for East Bengal, however, the club still went on to lose 3–2. He then scored his second goal of the season on 23 March 2014 against Rangdajied United after coming on as a 53rd-minute substitute for James Moga. East Bengal went on to win that match 3–1.

Doungel then finished his East Bengal career with two goals in two games. The first goal came against Pune on 19 April. His 75th-minute strike being the winner in a 2–1 victory for East Bengal. His second goal then came against United Sports Club on 28 April, being the last goal scored in a 3–0 rout.

Shillong Lajong
On 5 May 2014, following the conclusion of the 2013–14 season, it was announced that Doungel had signed for Shillong Lajong who also play in the I-League. Len represented NorthEast United in the 2014 Indian Super League, scoring once. Len played regularly for Lajong during the 2014-15 I-League season, scoring once in the final round against former club East Bengal in a 5–1 win which secured Lajong's stay in the I-League for the next season.

Bengaluru FC
On 3 June 2015, Bengaluru announced the signing of Len from Shillong Lajong on a two-year deal.

Delhi Dynamos (loan)
In July 2015 Doungel was chosen to play for Delhi Dynamos in the 2015 Indian Super League.

NorthEast United
On 23 July 2017, Doungel has been drafted to Northeast United FC for ISL season 4. On 6 January, Len scored his first goal in ISL-4 against FC Goa. He scored a hat-trick against Chennaiyin on 19 January making him the first Indian player to score a hat-trick in ISL-4 and also it was the first hat-trick of NorthEast United.

Kerala Blasters
In June 2018, Doungel signed a three-year contract with Kerala Blasters. He was then called to join the team camp of the India national team for the 2018 Intercontinental Cup.

FC Goa
On 20 May 2019, Doungel signed a two-year contract with Goa on a free transfer from Kerala Blasters. He will remain with the Gaurs till the summer of 2021.

Jamshedpur FC 
On 5 August 2021, it was announced that Doungel had signed a 3-year contract with Jamshedpur FC.

Career statistics

International

International goals
Scores and results list India's goal tally first

Honours

Jamshedpur
Indian Super League Premiers: 2021-22

References

External links

1994 births
Living people
People from Kangpokpi district
Indian footballers
India international footballers
India youth international footballers
East Bengal Club players
Indian Arrows players
Shillong Lajong FC players
NorthEast United FC players
Bengaluru FC players
Odisha FC players
Association football forwards
Footballers from Manipur
I-League players
Footballers at the 2014 Asian Games
Indian Super League players
Kerala Blasters FC players
Asian Games competitors for India
FC Goa players
Jamshedpur FC players